Günther Kruse (5 July 1934 – 18 January 2007) was an Argentine athlete. He competed in the men's discus throw at the 1956 Summer Olympics.

References

External links
 

1934 births
2007 deaths
Athletes (track and field) at the 1956 Summer Olympics
Argentine male discus throwers
Olympic athletes of Argentina
Place of birth missing